Jhinabhai Ratanji Desai (16 April 1903 – 6 January 1991), better known by his pen name Snehrashmi, was a Gujarati language author and Indian independence activist.

Life
Jhinabhai was born on 16 April 1903 at Chikhli, Bombay Presidency. He left studies of matriculation and joined Non-cooperation movement in 1920. He joined Gujarat Vidyapith in 1921 and graduated in political science from it in 1926. He taught history and political science at Gujarat Vidyapith from 1926 to 1928. He was jailed from 1932 to 1933 for his involvement in Indian independence activities. He joined Rashtriya Shala in 1934 as the principal.
He joined Sheth Chimanlal Nagindas Vidyalaya as the principal in 1938 and later served as its director. He served as the acting Vice Chancellor of Gujarat University thrice. He presided over Gujarati Sahitya Parishad at Madras in 1972. He also served as a senate and syndicate member in different universities of Gujarat. He also served as a member of the Sahitya Akademi and Historical Records Commission.

He was the president of Surat City Congress. He died on 6 January 1991.

Works
His initial works were influenced by nationalist sentiments and Gandhian ideals as he participated in Indian independence movement. His later works are more focused on the beauty and emotions. He chiefly wrote poetry and short stories but also ventured into other forms of literature.

Poetry
His poetry collections Ardhya (1935) and Panghat (1948) including Bar Majoor nu Geet (The Song of Twelve Peasants) are the examples of his Gandhian influence. His other poetry collections are Atitni Pankhmathi (1974), Kshitije Tya Lambavyo Hath (1984), Nijleela (1984).

He introduced haiku, Japanese short form of poetry, in Gujarati literature and popularized it. Soneri Chand Rooperi Suraj (1967) is the collection of 359 haiku and six tanka poems. Kevalveej (1984) and Sunrise on the Snowpeaks are his other haiku collections.

Tarapo (1980) and Ujani are collections of children's poetry. Sakal Kavita is the collection of all his poems published between 1921 and 1984.

Short story
Gata Aasopalav (1934) was his first short story collection. Tutela Taar (1934), Swarg ane Prithvi (1935), Moti Bahen (1955), Heera na Latkaniya (1962), Shrifal (1969), Kala Topi (1962) and Snehrashmi ni Shreshth Vartao (1983) are his other short story collections.

Autobiography
His autobiography starts from 1920. His childhood to his school education is described in Mari Duniya (1970). It is followed by Safalyatanu (1983) which has detailed account of the Non-cooperation movement and its leaders. It ends in 1933. It is followed by two more volumes, Ughade Navi Kshitijo (1987) and Divas Ugyo Ane.

Others
Antarpat (1961) is novel about social and cultural dimensions. Matodu ne Tulsi (1983) is his play collection. Bharat na Ghadvaiya (1957) is biography collection. Pratisad (1984) is his book on criticism.  Kavya Sangraha with Umashankar Joshi (1937), Sahitya Pallav (1941) and Sahitya Pathavali (1966) are his compilations.

Awards
He was awarded Presidents Award as the best teacher in 1961. He received Ranjitram Suvarna Chandrak in 1967 and Narmad Suvarna Chandrak in 1979. In 1987, he received  Sahitya Gaurav Puraskar.

References

Poets from Gujarat
1903 births
1991 deaths
Indian independence activists from Gujarat
Gujarati-language writers
Gujarati-language poets
20th-century Indian poets
Indian male poets
Recipients of the Ranjitram Suvarna Chandrak
20th-century Indian male writers
Haiku poets